Xarxar (also, Xar-xar and Kharkhar) is a village and municipality in the Gadabay Rayon of Azerbaijan.  It has a population of 1,550.

References 

Populated places in Gadabay District